Huichanglu Station is a station of Line 3, Suzhou Rail Transit. The station is located in Huqiu District of Suzhou. It has been in use since December 25, 2019, the same time of the opening of Line 3.

References 

Railway stations in Jiangsu
Suzhou Rail Transit stations
Railway stations in China opened in 2019